Harmony and Dissidence is the second full-length album by Jackson United. It was released in 2008 through Magnificent Records, Acetate Records and Deck Cheese Records.

History
The album was recorded during 2007 at Foo Fighters' personal Studio, 606 West in Northridge, CA, United States. All songs were written by Chris Shiflett, guitarist for Foo Fighters. It features bandmates Dave Grohl and Taylor Hawkins sharing drumming duties, as Jackson United did not have a regular drummer at the time of recording. Also featured on the album are Foo Fighters touring members Rami Jaffee and Drew Hester on keyboards and percussion respectively. Chad Blinman mixed the album at his personal studio, The Eye Socket.

The album was first released as a download album via iTunes on April 8, 2008, and CD versions followed later in Australia, Japan, United Kingdom (November 3) and United States (September 2).

Track listing
All songs written by Chris Shiflett

"21st Century Fight Song"
"Undertow"
"Black Regrets"
"Lifeboat"
"Trigger Happy"
"White Flag Burning"
"Stitching"
"The Land Without Law"
"The Day That No One Smiled"
"Damn You"
"Like A Bomb"
"You Can't Have It"

Bonus Tracks

International versions of the album came with the following bonus tracks:

"Help Save The Youth Of America" 
"Poison In The Blood" (UK Release only)
"Loose Ends" (US Release only)

On the UK edition of the CD, "Poison In The Blood" and "Help Save The Youth of America" are erroneously reversed on the disc compared to the track listing on the CD.

Personnel
Chris Shiflett – vocals, lead guitar
Scott Shiflett – bass guitar
Doug Sangalang – rhythm guitar
Dave Grohl – drums on tracks 2,3,4,5,6,7,11
Taylor Hawkins – drums on tracks 1,8,9,10,12
Rami Jaffee – keyboards
Drew Hester – percussion

Other
Producers: Jackson United
Engineers: Mike Terry, John Lousteau
Mixing: Chad Blinman
Mastering: Joe Gastwirt
Art direction and Design: Jeff Nicholas
Photography: Ricky Drasin, Gillian Jackman

References

Jackson United albums
2008 albums